Verta may refer to

 Ofer Verta, Israeli footballer
 Verta Taylor, academic sociologist
 Vega Research and Technology Accompaniment, see Vega (rocket)